Duguayville is a community in the Canadian province of New Brunswick. It is situated in Saint-Isidore Parish, a parish of Gloucester County.

History

Notable people

See also
List of communities in New Brunswick

References

Communities in Gloucester County, New Brunswick